George Ross Eaton (born 12 November 1945) is a Canadian former racing driver who is a member of the prominent Eaton family.

Life and career
Eaton was born in Toronto, he is the youngest son of John and Signy Eaton. He gained attention as a Canadian race driver who participated in Can Am, Formula One and Formula A races.

He served as president of the family company for ten years. Under his leadership, Eaton's continued its precipitous decline from its historic dominance in the Canadian retail market.

His Formula One career with British Racing Motors included 13 World Championship Grands Prix and one non-Championship race, debuting on 5 October 1969. He scored no championship points.

Eaton raced in the Can-Am series in 1968, 69 and 70. He was the top Canadian in the Can-Am Series in 1969. He participated in the Canadian Formula A series in 1969 and the Continental Series in 1969 and 1971 but retired from racing after 1972. He was inducted into the Canadian Motorsport Hall of Fame in 1994, and received an honorary doctor of laws degree from St Francis Xavier University at a special convocation in April 1996..

He attempted one NASCAR Grand National Series event in 1970 at Charlotte Motor Speedway but failed to qualify.

Complete Formula One World Championship results
(key)

See also
 List of Canadians in Champ Car

References

External links
Profile at www.grandprix.com

1945 births
Living people
George Eaton
24 Hours of Le Mans drivers
Canadian businesspeople
Canadian Formula One drivers
BRM Formula One drivers
Canadian people of Ulster-Scottish descent
Can-Am entrants
Racing drivers from Ontario
World Sportscar Championship drivers
24 Hours of Daytona drivers